Adam Bodzek (born 7 September 1985) is a German-Polish professional footballer who plays as a defensive midfielder for Fortuna Düsseldorf II.

Career

Bodzek started his career with MSV Duisburg.

Personal life
Bodzek was born in Zabrze, Poland.

References

External links 
 

1985 births
Living people
Sportspeople from Zabrze
Polish emigrants to Germany
Naturalized citizens of Germany
Polish footballers
German footballers
Association football midfielders
SpVgg Erkenschwick players
MSV Duisburg players
MSV Duisburg II players
Fortuna Düsseldorf players
Fortuna Düsseldorf II players
Bundesliga players
2. Bundesliga players